Protoscaphirhynchus squamosus is an extinct sturgeon from the Late Cretaceous of North America. It is known from a single poorly preserved specimen found in the Maastrichtian aged Hell Creek Formation in Montana. Due to its poor preservational state, it has few diagnostic characters.

See also
 Prehistoric fish
 List of prehistoric bony fish

References

Sturgeons
Prehistoric ray-finned fish genera
Late Cretaceous fish of North America
Maastrichtian life
Hell Creek fauna